Alien is the debut studio album by Jamaican-American rapper and singer Beam. It was released on February 4, 2022 by Epic Records. The album features guest appearances from Vory, Zacari, Justin Bieber, Jorja Smith, Landstrip Chip, Papa San (Beam's father), and Valee. Production was handled by Beam himself, Al Cres, Dutchboi, Nathan Butts, Cubeatz, Pyrex, Smash David, Ben Billions, Cardo, Johnny Juliano, Yung Exclusive, BlakeSale, Bongo, Bass Charity, Azul, Gray Hawken, Angelo Arce, Cadenza, Wallis Lane, Stephen Fealy III, Timmy, Keanu Beats, Compose, ChaseTheMoney, Dim Cruz, Reid Waters, Skrillex, Larrance Dopson, Carlton McDowell, Adam MacDougall, Boi-1da, Jahaan Sweet, and SkipOnDaBeat. The album was executive produced by Beam himself, Al Cres, and Whetstone Ent. It was preceded by three singles: "Anxiety", "Win" and "Planet Beam".

Background 
Speaking of Alien, Beam said:I just want people to realize that they are not the only ones who feel alienated in life. Whether that's a good or bad thing, you have to walk a narrow road. You feel alienated because you discern a certain thing that people don't understand. You get to digest a piece of my brain and get to know me on an artistic level with this album.

Release and promotion
On November 12, 2021, Beam announced through social media that the album had been completed. The lead single, "Anxiety", was released exactly one week later, on November 19, 2021. The second single, "Win", was released on January 14, 2022. On February 1, 2022, he teased another song on the album, "Sundown", which features Canadian singer Justin Bieber. The next day, he revealed the album along with its cover art and release date. The tracklist was revealed the day before its release. The third single, "Planet Beam", was released on 4 February, 2022 along with the album.

Critical reception 
Writing for DJBooth, Donna-Claire Chesman felt that "entering 'PLANET BEAM' means stepping into a world of discordant sounds that come together as the artist fuses dancehall, trap, and straight bars with danceability, adding that "ALIEN is an even wonkier evolution" as "BEAM darts between genres and sounds confident as ever". Attack the Culture wrote, "A true body of work, the album threads together an unpredictable trip through styles".

Track listing 

Notes
 All tracks are stylized in all caps.

Sample credits
 "PDF" contains samples from "Pon de Floor", written by Thomas Pentz, Adidja Palmer, and Nick van de Wall, as performed by Diplo featuring Vybz Kartel and Afrojack.

References 

2022 debut albums
Albums produced by Cubeatz
Albums produced by Cardo (record producer)
Albums produced by Skrillex
Albums produced by Boi-1da
Albums produced by Beam